Placement Group B of the 1998 Fed Cup Asia/Oceania Zone Group II was one of six pools in the Asia/Oceania Zone Group II of the 1998 Fed Cup. The three teams that placed second in the initial pools competed in a round robin competition.

Malaysia vs. Pakistan

Malaysia vs. Kazakhstan

Kazakhstan vs. Pakistan

See also
Fed Cup structure

References

External links
 Fed Cup website

1998 Fed Cup Asia/Oceania Zone